Marco Stark (born July 9, 1981 in Worms, Germany) is a German football player currently playing for Wormatia Worms.

External links
  Official site

1981 births
Living people
German footballers
Germany under-21 international footballers
1. FC Kaiserslautern II players
1. FC Kaiserslautern players
1. FC Saarbrücken players
Sportfreunde Siegen players
SV Wacker Burghausen players
FC Erzgebirge Aue players
SV Sandhausen players
Bundesliga players
2. Bundesliga players
3. Liga players
Association football defenders
People from Worms, Germany
Footballers from Rhineland-Palatinate